The Sheffield Wool Shear Workers Union was based in Sheffield, South Yorkshire, England. It was listed in the Guinness Book of Records (2000 edition) as being the smallest trades union in the world with just 10 members. In its last listing to the Trades Union Certification Officer it was down to nine members - six male and three female.

History
The union was established in 1890 to raise funds to organise, protect and advance the trade. Other functions include legal assistance, securing better working conditions for workers and to look after elderly wool shear workers. All their members were employed by steel firm Burgon & Ball.

The union was originally known as the Sheffield Shear Makers, Grinders, Finishers and Benders Union.  It affiliated to the National Amalgamated Union of Labour in 1914, but left again in 1920, adopting its final name.

Its final officer was Bob Whomersley, General Secretary, and it had headquarters in Rotherham.  In 2004 it received an income of £112.95, all of which was spent on administrative expenses.

It was affiliated to the Trades Union Congress until its removal from the list of recognised Trades Unions on 7 August 2007 on the grounds that it had ceased to exist.

General Secretaries
1890s: W. Wild
1900s: R. Oldfield
1900s: W. Ellis
1910s: H. Brammer
1923: J. Clixby
1943: P. Shaw
1951: G. W. Gore
1957: F. Timmins
1960: Jim Billard
1980s: Ray Cutler
1990s: Bob Whomersley

References

History of Sheffield
Organisations based in Sheffield
Defunct trade unions of the United Kingdom
1890 establishments in England
Engineering trade unions
2007 disestablishments in England
Trade unions established in 1890
Trade unions disestablished in 2007
Wool organizations
Trade unions based in South Yorkshire